Anders Ahlström (1 August 1948 – 13 June 2019) was a Swedish footballer and football manager. He made one appearance for Sweden and 27 Allsvenskan appearances for Djurgårdens IF.

Honours

Individual 
 Division 2 Norra Top Scorer (1): 1970.

References

Swedish footballers
Swedish football managers
Djurgårdens IF Fotboll players
1948 births
2019 deaths
Place of birth missing
Association football forwards